An alibi is a statement by a person, who is a possible perpetrator of a crime, of where they were at the time a particular offence was committed, which is somewhere other than where the crime took place.

Alibi(s) or The Alibi may also refer to:

Arts and entertainment

Film, television, theatre and podcasts
 Alibi (1929 film), an American crime film
 Alibi (1931 film), a British film based on the Agatha Christie play (see below)
 The Alibi (1937 film), a French mystery film
 Alibi (1942 film), a British mystery film
 Alibi (1955 film), a West German drama film
 Alibi (1969 film), an Italian comedy film
 Alibi, a 1997 American television film directed by Andy Wolk
 The Alibi, a 2006 American romantic comedy film
 Alibi (podcast), an African investigative podcast series. 
 Alibi (TV channel), formerly known as UKTV Drama
 "Alibi" (NCIS), a television episode
 "Alibi" (Vinyl), a television episode
 Alibi (play), a 1928 play by Agatha Christie
 The Alibi (play), by Arthur M. Brilant, adapted for the 1918 film Broken Ties

Literature
 Alibi, a 2005 novel by Joseph Kanon
 Weekly Alibi, a newspaper in Albuquerque, New Mexico, US
 Alibi Bar, a bar in the Nick Knatterton comic strip

Music
 Alibi (duo), English dance music duo
 Alibi, Swedish singer of Tunisian descent in the duo Medina

Albums
 Alibi (America album), 1980
 Alibi (Vandenberg album) or the title song, 1985
 Alibis (album) or the title song (see below), by Tracy Lawrence, 1993
 Alibis, by Carole Laure, 1978

Songs
 "Alibi" (David Gray song), 2006
 "Alibi" (Eddie Razaz song), 2013
 "Alibi" (Milica Pavlović song), 2014
 "Alibi", by Banks from Goddess, 2014
 "Alibi", by Bradley Cooper from the A Star Is Born film soundtrack, 2018
 "Alibi", by Elvis Costello from When I Was Cruel, 2002
 "Alibi", by Ringo Starr from Old Wave, 1983
 "Alibis" (song), by Tracy Lawrence, 1993
 "Alibis", by Marianas Trench from Fix Me, 2006
 "Alibis", by Martika from Martika, 1988
 "Alibis", by Moev, 1984
 "Alibis", by Sérgio Mendes from Confetti, 1984
 "Alibis", by Sneaker Pimps from Squaring the Circle (2021)

Other uses
 Alibi (Portland, Oregon), a restaurant
 Alibi transformation, in mathematics

See also
 "A" Is for Alibi, a 1982 novel by Sue Grafton